Giacomo "Jack" Galanda (born 30 January 1975) is a retired Italian professional basketball player. He was a forward-center of 2.10 m. (6 ft. 10¾ in.) and 110 kg. (243 lbs.).

Professional career
Galanda was born in Udine, Friuli. He grew up in the Scaligera Basket Verona junior teams, with which he made his debut in the Italian League on October 17, 1993. After four years in the Verona team, he was traded to Fortitudo Bologna. However, in his first year (1997–98) he was utilized as a reserve to Gregor Fučka, and had a limited impact.

In 1998, he was loaned to Pallacanestro Varese, where he was a leader of the team that, surprisingly, won the Italian League championship. Galanda therefore returned to Bologna, where he remained until 2003, when he was traded to Montepaschi Siena. He won two further Italian league championships in 2000 and 2004. In the 2005–06 season, Galanda played with Armani Jeans Milano. From 2006 to 2011, he played for Pallacanestro Varese. In 2011, he signed with Giorgio Tesi Group Pistoia. In May 2014, he announced his retirement.

Italian national team
Galanda made his debut with the senior men's Italian national basketball team in 1997, and soon turned into one of the more representative players from his country. Some of his successes with the Azzurri jersey include silver and gold medals at the FIBA EuroBasket (1997 and 1999, respectively), and a silver medal at the 2004 Summer Olympic Games of Athens.

References

External links 
 Euroleague.net Profile
 FIBA.com Profile
 Eurobasket.com Profile
 Italian League Profile 

1975 births
Living people
Basketball players at the 2000 Summer Olympics
Basketball players at the 2004 Summer Olympics
Centers (basketball)
FIBA EuroBasket-winning players
Fortitudo Pallacanestro Bologna players
Italian men's basketball players
Lega Basket Serie A players
Medalists at the 2004 Summer Olympics
Mens Sana Basket players
Olimpia Milano players
Olympic basketball players of Italy
Olympic medalists in basketball
Olympic silver medalists for Italy
Pallacanestro Varese players
Sportspeople from Udine
Pistoia Basket 2000 players
Power forwards (basketball)
Scaligera Basket Verona players
1998 FIBA World Championship players